Charles or Charlie Morris may refer to:

People

Soldiers 
 Charles Morris (surveyor general) (1711–1781), Canadian army officer, officeholder, and judge
 Charles Morris (naval officer) (1784–1856), US naval administrator and officer
 Charles Manigault Morris (1820–1895), US Navy officer
 Charles B. Morris (1931–1996), American soldier and Medal of Honor recipient
 Charles Temple Morris (1876–1956), officer in the British Indian Army

Politicians 
 Charles Morris (1731–1802), Canadian surveyor, judge and political figure in Nova Scotia
 Charles Morris (1759–1831), Canadian surveyor and political figure in Nova Scotia
 Charles Morris (Australian politician) (1863–1918), Member of South Australian Legislative Council
 Charles Morris (British politician) (1926–2012), British MP for Manchester, Openshaw
 Charles E. Morris (1814–1902), Wisconsin judge and politician
 Charles F. Morris (1876–1951), Wisconsin lawyer and politician

Scientists and academics 
 Charles A. Morris (1853–1914), American engineer
 Charles Morris, Baron Morris of Grasmere (1898–1990), British philosopher and life peer
 Charles W. Morris (1901–1979), American semiotician and philosopher
 Charles Morris (legal educator) (21st century), American professor of law emeritus at Southern Methodist University School of Law

Sportsmen 
 Charles Morris (boxer) (1879–1959), British Olympic medalist in 1908
 Charles Morris (cricketer, born 1880) (1880–1947), English cricketer
 Charlie Morris (footballer) (1880–1952), Welsh international footballer
 Charles Morris (athlete) (born 1915), British Olympian racewalker
 Charlie Morris (athlete) (1926–2015), Australian hammer thrower
 Charles Morris (cricketer, born 1939), English cricketer
 Charles Morris (cricketer, born 1992), English cricketer
 Charles Morris (New Zealand cricketer) (born 1840), New Zealand cricketer

Writers 
 Charles R. Morris (1939–2021), American business writer
 Charles Morris (American writer) (1833–1922), American writer of dime novels
 Charles Morris (poet) (1745–1838), British poet
 Charles Morris, author and host of the Haven Today radio program from 2000 to the present

Fictional characters

Characters 
 Charlie Morris (The Dumping Ground character), portrayed by Emily Burnett